Anti-tank obstacles include, but are not limited to:
The Czech hedgehog and Dragon's teeth are the most famous types of World War II anti-tank obstacles.
Anti-tank trenches were used on the western front during World War I, and in the Pacific, Europe, and Russia in World War II.
Anti-tank mines are the most common anti-tank obstacles.

For implementation of various anti-tank obstacles:
For British anti-tank obstacles, see: British anti-invasion preparations of World War II#Lines and islands.
The Korean Demilitarized Zone is known to have very large minefields.
The Berlin Wall used many different obstacles, including several types of anti-tank obstacles.
The Atlantic Wall used many different obstacles, including several types of anti-tank obstacles.
The Czechoslovak border fortifications used many different obstacles, including several types of anti-tank obstacles.
The Mannerheim Line used many different obstacles, including several types of anti-tank obstacles.
The Maginot Line used many different obstacles, including several types of anti-tank obstacles.

See also
Anti-tank warfare
:Category:Anti-tank obstacles

External links